A number of motor vessels have been named Stirlingshire, including –

, a British cargo ship in service 1929–40
, a British refrigerated cargo liner in service 1946–66.

Ship names